Mat, Matt or Matthew Fraser may refer to:

Mat Fraser (actor) (born 1962), English performance artist and rock musician
Mat Fraser (athlete) (born 1990), American CrossFit Games winner
Matt Fraser (born 1990), Canadian ice hockey player
Matt Fraser (psychic) (born 1991), American medium
Matthew Fraser (journalist) (born 1958), Canadian media academic and TV presenter
Matthew Fraser, American student in 1986 Supreme Court case Bethel School District v. Fraser*

See also
Matt Frazer, American racing driver 98th in 2008 ASA Midwest Tour season